Thomas Königshofer (born June 1, 1969) is a retired Austrian cyclist who won a bronze medal at the UCI Motor-paced World Championships in 1989. He is the brother of Roland Königshofer who won those championships and an uncle of Lukas Königshofer, an Austrian football player.

References

External links
Roland  & Thomas Königshofer photo

Living people
Austrian male cyclists
Place of birth missing (living people)
Austrian track cyclists
1969 births
Cyclists from Vienna